Bean Settlement is an unincorporated community in Hardy County, West Virginia, United States. According to the Geographic Names Information System, the Bean Settlement community has also been known as Asbury, Asbury Church, Bean's, and Fabius.

Historic sites 
Asbury Church

References

Unincorporated communities in Hardy County, West Virginia
Unincorporated communities in West Virginia